Walmore is a hamlet in the town of Wheatfield in Niagara County, New York, United States.

Point of Interest
St. Peter's Lutheran Church and School

Walmore Inn - 2201 Lockport Rd, Sanborn, NY 14132

References

Hamlets in New York (state)
Hamlets in Niagara County, New York